Johannes is a Medieval Latin form of the personal name that usually appears as "John" in English language contexts. It is a variant of the Greek and Classical Latin variants (Ιωάννης, Ioannes), itself derived from the Hebrew name Yehochanan, meaning "Yahweh is gracious". The name became popular in Northern Europe, especially in Germany because of Christianity. Common German variants for Johannes are Johann, Hannes, Hans (diminutized to Hänschen or Hänsel, as known from "Hansel and Gretel", a fairy tale by the Grimm brothers), Jens (from Danish) and Jan (from Dutch, and found in many countries). In the Netherlands, Johannes was without interruption the most common masculine birth name until 1989. The English equivalent for Johannes is John.

In other languages 
Joan, Jan, Gjon, Gjin and Gjovalin in Albanian
Yoe or Yohe, uncommon American form
Yaḥyā, in Arabic
Chuan, in Aragonese
Johannes in Estonian
Hovhannes, in Armenian
Ioannis, in Greek
Joanes, Joan, Jon, in Basque
Joan, in Catalan and Occitan
Hannes, Jaan, Jaanus, Joonas, Juhan and the familiar variants Juku and Juss in Estonian
Yohannes, in Northern Ethiopian Semitic languages
Jóannes, in Faroese
Hannes, Jaani, Jani, Janne, Jone, Joni, Juho, Jonne, Joona, Joonas, Juha, Juhani, Jukka, Jussi, Hannu, and Johannes in Finnish
Jean, in French
Xoán, in Galician
Jóhannes and Hannes in Icelandic
Yohanes, in Indonesian 
Eoghan or Eóin, in Irish or Scottish Gaelic
Giovanni, in Italian
Jānis, in Latvian
Jonas, in Lithuanian
Jan, in Polish
João, in Portuguese
Ioan, in Romanian
Ivan (Иван), in Russian
Juan, in Spanish
Yahya, in Turkish
Xun, in the Tzotzil language and Tzeltal language
Ieuan or Ifan, with the diminutive Ianto, in Welsh, anglicized as "Evan"

People with the given name

Johannes or Jóhannes 
Alain Johannes, born Alain Johannes Mociulski, American multi-instrumentalist
Johannes Aavik (1880–1973), Estonian philologist and Fennophile
Jóhannes Ásbjörnsson, Icelandic radio and TV show host
Jóhannes Atlason (born 1944), Icelandic footballer and football manager
Johannes Bitter (born 1982), German handball goalkeeper
Johannes Bjelke-Petersen, former Premier of Queensland
Johannes Brahms (1833–1897), German romantic composer
Johannes Brost (1946–2018), Swedish actor
Joannes Corvus (fl. 1512–1544), Flemish painter
Johannes Edfelt (1904–1997), Swedish writer
Jóhannes Eðvaldsson (1950–2021), Icelandic footballer
Johannes Geis (born 1993), German footballer
Johannes Gutenberg (1400–1468), German printer
Johannes Hassebroek (1910–1977), German Nazi SS concentration camp commandant
Johannes Heesters (1903–2011), Dutch actor, singer and entertainer
Johannes Helms (1828–1895), Danish writer and schoolmaster
Johannes V. Jensen, Danish writer and Nobel Prize winner
Johannes of Jerusalem (1042–1119), abbot of the monastery at Vézelay, France
Jóhannes Haukur Jóhannesson (born 1980), Icelandic actor
Jóhannes Jónsson (1940–2013), Icelandic businessman
Jóhannes Geir Jónsson (1927–2003), Icelandic painter
Jóhannes Gunnarsson (1897–1972), Icelandic prelate of the Roman Catholic Church
Jóhannes Harðarson (born 1976), Icelandic footballer and coach
Jóhannes Helgason (born 1958), Icelandic guitarist
Johannes Käbin (1905–1999), Soviet Estonian politician
Johannes Karhapää (1884–1918), Finnish missionary and a saint of the Eastern Orthodox Church
Johannes Kass (born 1949), Estonian politician
Johannes Kepler (1571–1630), German astronomer
Johannes Kerkorrel, South African singer and musician
Jóhannes Sveinsson Kjarval (1885–1972), Icelandic painter
Johannes Kotkas (1915–1998), Estonian wrestler
Jóhannes úr Kötlum (1899–1972), Icelandic writer and poet
Johannes Leimena (1905–1977), founder of the Indonesian Christian Party
Johannes Linnankoski (1869–1913), Finnish author
Johannes Linstead, Canadian guitarist and composer
Johannes Lötter, a Boer commandant in the Boer War
Johannes Lucius, Dalmatian historian
Johannes Ludovicus Paquay (1828–1905), Friar Minor known as Valentinus
Johannes Chrysostomus Wolfgangus Theophilus Mozart, Classical era composer
Johannes Niks (1912–1997), Estonian footballer
Johannes Orasmaa (1890–1943), Estonian Army General
Johannes Pääsuke (1892–1918), Estonian photographer and filmmaker
Johannes Radebe, South African dancer
Johannes Rau (1931–2006), German politician
Johannes Richter (basketball) (born 1993), German basketball player
Johannes Rudbeckius (1581–1646), Swedish bishop
Johannes Semper (1892–1970), Estonian writer and translator
Johannes Siir (1889–1941), Estonian military colonel and sport shooter
Johannes Sikkar (1897–1960), Estonian politician
Johannes Soodla (1897–1965), Estonian military officer
Johannes Toom (1896–1972), Estonian weightlifter
Johannes Undusk (1918–1979), Estonian Communist politician
Johannes van Damme, Dutch engineer, businessman and murderer
Johannes Vares (1890–1946), Estonian poet, doctor, and politician
Johannes Vermeer, Dutch painter
Johannes Vetter, German athlete
Johannes Vilberg (1903–1981), Estonian sport shooter
Johannes Virolainen, former Prime Minister of Finland
Johannes Voigtmann (born 1992), German basketball player
Johannes "Honus" Wagner (1874–1955), American baseball player
Johannes Wohlwend, Liechtenstein judoka and sports official
Jóhannes Ásbjörnsson (born 1979), Icelandic TV and radio show host
Yohannes IV, Ethiopian 19th-century Emperor

Joanes 

 Joanes Leizarraga (1506–1601), Basque priest
 Joanes Rail (born 1958), Canadian Olympic handball player
 Joanes Urkixo (born 1955), Basque language writer

Johanes 

 Johanes Anabo (born 1939), American football player
 Johanes Maliza (born 1981), American soccer player

Pseudonyms
Johannes Climacus, pseudonym of Søren Kierkegaard in Philosophical Fragments and Concluding Unscientific Postscript
Johannes de Silentio, pseudonym of Søren Kierkegaard in Fear and Trembling

Fictional characters
 Johannes Cabal, the main character of a series of supernatural fiction novels and short stories by Jonathan L. Howard. Novels include: Johannes Cabal the Necromancer (2009), Johannes Cabal the Detective (2010), Johannes Cabal: The Fear Institute (2011). Short stories: "Johannes Cabal and the Blustery Day" (2004), "Exeunt Demon King" (2006), "The Ereshklig Working" (2010), and "The House of Gears" (2011).
 Johannes (The Traitor), the main antagonist in the video game Rogue Legacy
 Johannes "Jojo" Betzler, the title character of 2019 film Jojo Rabbit
 Johannes Krauser II, the alter ego of the main character in the anime/manga Detroit Metal City

People with the surname
 Klaus Iohannis, Romanian president of German origin

Variants
 Iohannes (consul 467), Roman consul in 467
 Joannes, Roman emperor in 423–425
 Schinderhannes, German outlaw

References

Masculine given names
Danish masculine given names
Dutch masculine given names
Estonian masculine given names
Finnish masculine given names
German masculine given names
Norwegian masculine given names
Scandinavian masculine given names
Swedish masculine given names